J'Aton Couture is a Melbourne-based couture house, established by Jacob Luppino and Anthony Pittorino in 1995.

History
J'Aton is a renowned fashion house founded by Jacob Luppino and Anthony Pittorino in Ascot Vale, Melbourne. The brand later relocated tospecialising ere it operates a showroom and atelier specialising in the creation of bespoke evening and bridal wear. Both designers draw on their sartorial Italian heritage and employ traditional techniques in the crafting of their unique gowns. Through their commitment to producing high-quality garments and their reputation as skilled designers, J'Aton has been able to establish a loyal and discerning clientele, both nationally and internationallfavourite rand has garnered a reputation for being a favourite among Australia's societal and celebrity elite.

Work 
J'Aton Couture has been recipient of many awards, including the 2009 Prix de Marie Claire Awards for Best Eveningwear Designers and numerous Australian Gown of the Year acknowledgments. 
In addition to private couture requests, the house has created many custom-made evening gowns for local and international red carpets, and editorial assignments.

Many high-profile women have worn the label including Tina Arena, Dita von Teese, Charlize Theron, Kylie Minogue and Dannii Minogue, Melissa George, Delta Goodrem, Lily Cole and Keisha Whitaker.

For the 2009 Academy Awards Ceremony, J'Aton also dressed Heath Ledger's mother, Sally Bell, for her acceptance of his posthumous Academy Award.

Most recently, Sam Worthington's partner Natalie Mark wore a diamond embellished, Avatar-inspired gown by the label to the 2010 Academy Awards.

Dannii Minogue was well known for often wearing J'Aton Couture dresses on shows of The X Factor UK in 2008, 2009 and 2010. Minogue is also known to wear the dresses on Australia's Got Talent.

Destruction of studio

On 10 December 2008, fire engulfed the labels atelier, above the Greville Street showroom. The resulting damage to the premises and its contents included the destruction of twenty evening gowns estimated to be valued at $300,000. The substantial financial loss and the event of the fire and clean-up itself, forced the designers to delay J'Aton Couture's move to New York. In which they are now currently based out of.

References

External links
 Official Website

Australian companies established in 1995
Clothing brands of Australia
Clothing retailers of Australia
Australian brands
Australian fashion
High fashion brands
Retail companies established in 1995
Companies based in Sydney